Hans Kurt  (23 February 1909 – 19 October 1968) was a Danish stage and film actor.

Filmography
Skal vi vædde en million? (Do You Want to Bet a Million?) – 1932 
Nøddebo Præstegård – 1934
Jeg har elsket og levet – 1940
Alle går rundt og forelsker sig – 1941
En søndag på Amager – 1941
Thummelumsen – 1941
Alle mand på dæk – 1942
Tordenskjold går i land – 1942
Teatertosset – 1944
Man elsker kun een gang – 1945
Røverne fra Rold – 1947
I de lyse nætter – 1948
Mød mig på Cassiopeia – 1951
 This Is Life (1953)
Karen, Maren og Mette – 1954
Himlen er blå – 1954
Vi som går stjernevejen – 1956
Hvad vil De ha'? – 1956
Ingen tid til kærtegn – 1957
Amor i telefonen – 1957
Kvindelist og kærlighed – 1960
Sømand i knibe – 1960
Gøngehøvdingen – 1961
Duellen – 1962
Frk. Nitouche – 1963
Hvis lille pige er du? – 1963
Landmandsliv – 1965

References

External links

Danish male stage actors
Danish male film actors
20th-century Danish male actors
1909 births
1968 deaths
Burials at Mariebjerg Cemetery